Vestre Hestlægerhøe or Vestre Hestlægerhø is a mountain on the border of Vågå Municipality and Lom Municipality in Innlandet county, Norway.

The mountain is surrounded by several other notable mountains including Styggehøi to the west, Glittertinden to the north, and Austre Hestlægerhøe and Nautgardsoksli to the east. The mountain area drains via the river Veo to the north and the river Russa to the south, both tributaries of the river Sjoa.

See also
List of mountains of Norway

References

External links 
 Images of the Vestre Hestlægerhøe at Fjellet i Bilder
 Weather at the Vestre Hestlægerhøe at YR

Mountains of Innlandet
Lom, Norway
Vågå